The white-bellied lesser house bat (Scotoecus albigula) is a species of vesper bat. It can be found in Angola, Kenya, Malawi, Mozambique, Somalia, Uganda, and Zambia.

References

Scotoecus
Taxa named by Oldfield Thomas
Mammals described in 1909
Bats of Africa
Taxonomy articles created by Polbot
Taxobox binomials not recognized by IUCN